Timothy P. Egan (born November 8, 1954) is an American author, journalist and former op-ed columnist for The New York Times, writing from a liberal perspective.

Egan has written nine books. His first, The Good Rain, won the Pacific Northwest Booksellers Association Award in 1991. For The Worst Hard Time, a 2006 book about people who lived through the Great Depression's Dust Bowl, he won the National Book Award for Nonfiction and the Washington State Book Award in History/Biography. His book on the photographer Edward Curtis, "Short Nights of the Shadow Catcher," won the 2013 Carnegie Medal for Excellence for nonfiction. The Big Burn: Teddy Roosevelt and the Fire that Saved America (2009) is about the Great Fire of 1910, which burned about three million acres (12,000 km2) and helped shape the United States Forest Service. The book describes some of the political issues facing Theodore Roosevelt. For this work he won a second Washington State Book Award in History/Biography and a second Pacific Northwest Booksellers Association Award.

In 2001, The New York Times won a Pulitzer Prize for National Reporting for a series to which Egan contributed, "How Race is Lived in America".

Egan lives in Seattle, a third-generation Westerner.

Awards and honors

2013 Chautauqua Prize, winner, Short Nights of the Shadow Catcher
2013 Andrew Carnegie Medal for Excellence in Nonfiction, winner, Short Nights of the Shadow Catcher

Works

 The Immortal Irishman: The Irish Revolutionary Who Became an American Hero. 2016.

References

External links

Pulitzer Prize for National Reporting winners
National Book Award winners
Living people
University of Washington alumni
Writers from Seattle
The New York Times Pulitzer Prize winners
1954 births